The Giuseppe Garibaldi-class cruisers were a class of ten armoured cruisers built in Italy in the 1890s and the first decade of the 20th century. The ships were built for both the Royal Italian Navy (Regia Marina) and for export. With the class being named for Italian unifier and nationalist Giuseppe Garibaldi.

Design and description

The design of the Giuseppe Garibaldi-class cruiser was derived by the naval architect Edoardo Masdea from his earlier  design. The Garibaldis were slightly larger and about a knot faster than their predecessors, but the primary improvement was the addition of two gun turrets, one each fore and aft of the superstructure. These remedied a major weakness of the older ships in that their primary armament, being on the broadside, could not engage targets that were directly in front or behind. The design was so popular that ten cruisers were purchased by four different countries; the Royal Italian Navy, the Argentine Navy, the Imperial Japanese Navy, and the Spanish Navy. As might be expected over a group of ships that was built from 1892 to 1903, design improvements and more modern equipment were incorporated over time so that only the three ships actually accepted by Italy were true sisters.

The first five ships were built to the same measurements, and form the Garibaldi sub-class, but the last five were stretched by six frames amidships, and comprise the Giuseppe Garibaldi sub-class. They displaced  at normal load.

The class was unusual in that they did not have a uniform main armament. Some had single  Elswick Pattern R guns in gun turrets fore and aft; others (including Kasuga) had a mixed armament of a single  gun in one turret and another turret with twin  guns. A third variation (including Nisshin) was a uniform armament of four  guns in twin gun turrets fore and aft. Cristobal Colon was fitted with 10-inch guns which the Spanish admiralty claimed were defective and which were removed before it was committed to combat. Therefore, it only went to battle with 10 smokeless powder Armstrong six inch guns mounted in the hull (5 on each side).

Ships
All ships were built by Gio. Ansaldo & C. in Genoa-Sestri Ponente, except ARA San Martin and ARA Belgrano which were subcontracted to Orlando in Livorno.

Construction and service
In addition, Spain was planning to acquire a second "Garibaldi"-class cruiser, to be named Pedro de Aragon. These plans were shelved after the Spanish–American War and the subsequent downsizing of the Spanish Armada.

Two of the Italian ships ordered in 1902 were sold to the Argentine Navy before completion as the Mitre and Roca; they were renamed as the Rivadavia and the Mariano Moreno.

Gallery

Notes

Bibliography 

 
Cowan, Mark and Sumrall, Alan  "Old Hoodoo" The Battleship Texas, America's First Battleship (1895-1911) 2011

External links

History of the Argentinian ships, at HISTARMAR 
Specifications of the Argentinian ships, at HISTARMAR 
 Classe Giuseppe Garibaldi (1899) Marina Militare website

 
Cruiser classes